Anarbala is a Bollywood film. It was released in 1940.

References

External links
 
 bollywood movie song

1940 films
1940s Hindi-language films
Indian black-and-white films
Indian horror films
1940 horror films
Hindi-language horror films